Oblique is an album by vibraphonist Bobby Hutcherson, featuring performances by Herbie Hancock, Albert Stinson, and Joe Chambers. The album was recorded on July 21, 1967. Oblique was Hutcherson's second recording in a quartet setting, after Happenings, The personnel on Happenings are identical, save the replacement of Bob Cranshaw with Stinson, but did not get released by Blue Note until 1979 as a limited edition in Japan, followed by a regular issue in 1980.

Reception 

AllMusic reviewer Steve Huey awarded four and a half stars to the album, saying: "All the performances are spirited enough to make the sophisticated music sound winning and accessible as well, which means that Oblique is one of the better entries in Hutcherson's Blue Note discography and one worth tracking down." The Penguin Guide to Jazz wrote that the quartet recording was "a likeable enough set, but [it] doesn't really add anything to the language of the first [Happenings]".

Track listing 
 "'Til Then" (Hutcherson) - 4:44
 "My Joy" (Hutcherson) - 7:10
 "Theme from Blow Up" (Hancock) - 8:13
 "Subtle Neptune" (Hutcherson) - 8:33
 "Oblique" (Chambers) - 7:18
 "Bi-Sectional" (Chambers) - 5:04

Source:

Personnel 
Bobby Hutcherson - vibes, drums
Herbie Hancock - piano
Albert Stinson - bass
Joe Chambers - drums, tympani, gong

Source:

References 

1980 albums
Blue Note Records albums
Bobby Hutcherson albums
Post-bop albums
Albums produced by Alfred Lion
Albums recorded at Van Gelder Studio